The 69th edition of the Volta a la Comunitat Valenciana (English: Tour of the Valencian Community) was held from 31 January to 4 February 2018. It was run over five stages, of which one team time trial, covering a total distance of 691.8 km. It was a 2.1 event of the 2018 UCI Europe Tour. The race was run entirely in the autonomous community of Valencia, starting in Orpesa and finishing in Valencia.

Luis León Sánchez was second, Jakob Fuglsang third. Valverde's overall win was his third in the race after 2004 and 2007, which made him the recordholder of the Volta a la Comunitat Valenciana.

Teams
Twenty-five teams started the race. Each team had a maximum of seven riders:

Route

Stages

Stage 1

Stage 2

Stage 3
The time trial result was neutralised.

Stage 4

Stage 5

Classifications

References

External links

 

2018
2018 UCI Europe Tour
2018 in Spanish road cycling